The second cabinet of P.W. Botha was formed following his assumption of the position of State President, on 3 September 1984. It was dissolved on 6 September 1989, after Botha's incapacitation following a stroke in January of that year. After Botha's resignation in February, he was replaced by Chris Heunis as acting State President for the remaining few months of the cabinet's term. Heunis was replaced with F.W. de Klerk, who was elected leader of the National Party on 2 February and inaugurated as State President on September 20.

Cabinet

References

Government of South Africa
Executive branch of the government of South Africa
Cabinets of South Africa
1987 establishments in South Africa
1989 disestablishments in South Africa
Cabinets established in 1987
Cabinets disestablished in 1989